Robert A. Winn is an American oncologist who is the Director and Lipman Chair in Oncology at the Virginia Commonwealth University Massey Cancer Center. His research considers the cellular mechanisms that drive the development of lung cancer. He has also investigated health disparities in cancer treatment and the development of strategies to eliminate mistrust amongst African-American communities.

Early life and education 
Winn was born and raised in Buffalo, New York. He was the first member of his family to attend colllege. He started studying psychology at the University of Notre Dame, where he was supported by a football scholarship. He was encouraged to train as a physician, and completed a bachelor's degree in medicine at the University of Michigan. At Michigan, he was taught by Francis Collins, who inspired him to combine clinical practice and academic research. He specialized in internal medicine, and completed an internship and residency at Rush University Medical Center. Winn was then a fellow in pulmonary medicine at the University of Colorado Health Sciences Center. He became interested in lung cancer. At the time, the only treatments available were based on cisplatin, and the outcomes were not good.

Research and career 
Winn joined the faculty at the University of Colorado Health Sciences Center, where he held various positions including Associate Dean. He researched cellular mechanisms that drive the development of lung cancer, and looked for the development of new diagnostic strategies. He campaigned to improve access to high-quality, low-density CT scans amongst underserved populations. He moved to the University of Illinois Hospital & Health Sciences System and in 2015 was appointed Director of the University of Illinois Cancer Centre.

In 2019, Winn was appointed Director of the Virginia Commonwealth University Cancer Center. At the time, he was the only African-American to serve as director of a National Cancer Institute cancer center. Alongside his research, Winn is committed to improving equity and inclusion in oncology. He has looked to improve trust amongst people who have previously been disenfranchised by their interactions with the medical sector. During the COVID-19 pandemic, Winn established "Facts & Faith Fridays", a conversation series that provided a forum for discussion between faith leaders, scientists and community members.

In partnership with Bristol Myers Squibb, Winn established a $100 million Clinical Trials Award Program, which aims to increase diversity in clinical trials. The program supports physicians to engage historically marginalized communities and provides medicial students with a 6-week summer 'externship' on community-based clinical research placements.

Winn is president elect of the Association of American Cancer Institutes, and serves on the Board of the American Cancer Society and LUNGevity.

Awards and honors 
 2017 National Cancer Institute's Center to Reduce Cancer Health Disparities
 2021 Association of American Cancer Institutes Cancer Health Equity Award

Selected publications

References 

Year of birth missing (living people)
Living people
People from Buffalo, New York
Physicians from New York (state)
20th-century American physicians
21st-century American physicians
University of Notre Dame alumni
University of Michigan alumni
Virginia Commonwealth University faculty
American oncologists
20th-century African-American physicians
21st-century African-American physicians